Elliot Ford (born 26 May 1996) is a Scottish professional footballer who plays for East Region Super League club Thornton Hibs as a defender and attacking midfielder.

Ford has previously played for Rangers and Hearts at youth level and Raith Rovers and Brechin City at senior level.

Ford has represented Scotland at under-17 whilst a member of Hearts.

Background

Ford was born in Kirkcaldy and grew up in nearby Glenrothes, where he attended Auchmuty High School.

Club career

Rangers
Ford began his career at local boys club team St.Johns before embarking on his professional career in the youth ranks at Rangers. Ford spent the first year of his professional youth career with the Glasgow club at Under 13 Level.

Heart of Midlothian
Following Ford's departure from the club at the age of 12, he went on to join Edinburgh club Hearts, where he would spend the majority of his youth career.  During his period at the club, Ford was a member of the squad that reached the 2013/14 Scottish youth cup final. Ford progressed through the youth system before signing his first professional contract and becoming a member of the clubs under 20 development team.

Raith Rovers
Following the club's financial difficulties at the end of the 2013/14 season, Ford moved to hometown club Raith Rovers. Ford spent the next two seasons at the club where he would make his professional debut in a Scottish Challenge Cup match against Cowdenbeath.

Brechin City
Following his departure at the close of the 2015/16 season, Ford signed for Scottish League One team Brechin City following a successful trial period. Ford went on to make his debut for the club in a Scottish League Cup match against  Elgin City. Ford was a key member of the Brechin side that went on to win promotion to the Scottish Championship for the first time in 11 years, defeating and relegating his former side Raith Rovers in the semi final fixtures, and Alloa Athletic in the Championship play-offs final. Ford scored his first goal for the club in the Championship play-offs final first leg against Alloa Athletic in a 1-0 victory.

Following on from the playoff success, Ford extended his contract at the club for the following season when Brechin City competed in the second tier of the Scottish Professional Football League for the first time since 2006 and, the club's first appearance in the Scottish Championship since its re-branding in 2013.

Kelty Hearts
Ford moved early in the 2017–18 season following appearances in the Scottish League Cup and Scottish Championship in search of more regular first team football. A successful short loan spell at the Fife club lead to a permanent move, with Ford signing a two-year deal with the club in the January transfer window.

Thornton Hibs

Ford moved to East Region Junior side Thornton Hibs in August 2019. He looks forward to playing for his local side in the East Region South Super League. 'It's good to be a hibby'

International career

Ford was selected for the under-17 national team squad in 2013 where he made his international debut in a friendly match against Northern Ireland under-17.

Career statistics

Honours

Club

Brechin City 
Scottish Championship Play-offs: 2016–17

Kelty Hearts
East of Scotland Football League: 2017–18
Lowland League Play-offs Winner: 2017–18

References

Living people
Scottish Football League players
Raith Rovers F.C. players
Brechin City F.C. players
Scottish footballers
Scotland youth international footballers
Association football defenders
Scottish Professional Football League players
Footballers from Fife
1996 births